James Kimbrough Jones (September 29, 1839June 1, 1908) was a Confederate Army veteran, plantation owner, lawyer, US Congressional Representative, United States Senator and chairman of the Democratic National Committee from Arkansas.

Biography
Born in Marshall County, Mississippi, Jones moved with his father to Dallas County, Arkansas in 1848. He pursued classical studies under a private tutor; he would later study law and was, in 1874, admitted to the bar, practicing in Washington, Arkansas.

During the American Civil War, Jones served in the Confederate Army, and returned to his Arkansas plantation afterward. From 1873 to 1879, he was a member of the Arkansas State Senate, and was president of that body from 1877 to 1879. In 1896 and 1900, he was the chairman of the Democratic National Committee.

Jones was elected as a Democrat to the Forty-seventh and Forty-eighth Congresses (March 4, 1881 – March 3, 1885); he was re-elected to the Forty-ninth but tendered his resignation on February 19, 1885, having been elected to the United States Senate that year. Jones was reelected in 1891 and 1897 and served from March 4, 1885, to March 3, 1903, unsuccessfully seeking reelection in 1902. While in the Senate, he was chairman of the Committee on Indian Affairs (Fifty-third Congress), Committee on Corporations Organized in the District of Columbia (Fifty-fourth and Fifty-fifth Congresses), Committee on Private Land Claims (Fifty-fifth Congress.)

After his Congressional service, Jones resumed the practice of law in Washington, D.C., where he died; he was buried in Rock Creek Cemetery.

References

Sources
 Retrieved on March 24, 2010

|-

|-

|-

|-

|-

|-

1839 births
1908 deaths
19th-century American politicians
American people of Welsh descent
American planters
Arkansas lawyers
Democratic Party Arkansas state senators
Burials at Rock Creek Cemetery
Confederate States Army soldiers
Democratic National Committee chairs
Democratic Party members of the United States House of Representatives from Arkansas
Democratic Party United States senators from Arkansas
Lawyers from Washington, D.C.
People from Dallas County, Arkansas
People from Marshall County, Mississippi